North Seekonk is a census-designated place (CDP) in the town of Seekonk in Bristol County, Massachusetts, United States. The population was 2,643 at the 2010 census.

Geography
North Seekonk is located at  (41.892199, -71.328174).

According to the United States Census Bureau, the CDP has a total area of 3.4 km (1.3 mi). 3.4 km (1.3 mi) of it is land and 0.1 km (0.04 mi) of it (1.50%) is water.

Demographics

As of the census of 2000, there were 2,598 people, 985 households, and 761 families residing in the CDP. The population density was 759.9/km (1,975.1/mi). There were 1,009 housing units at an average density of 295.1/km (767.1/mi). The racial makeup of the CDP was 97.61% White, 0.42% African American, 0.15% Native American, 1.23% Asian, 0.35% from other races, and 0.23% from two or more races. Hispanic or Latino of any race were 1.04% of the population.

There were 985 households, out of which 31.6% had children under the age of 18 living with them, 62.8% were married couples living together, 10.1% had a female householder with no husband present, and 22.7% were non-families. 19.1% of all households were made up of individuals, and 10.5% had someone living alone who was 65 years of age or older. The average household size was 2.64 and the average family size was 3.00.

In the CDP, the population was spread out, with 23.9% under the age of 18, 5.9% from 18 to 24, 29.9% from 25 to 44, 22.9% from 45 to 64, and 17.4% who were 65 years of age or older. The median age was 40 years. For every 100 females, there were 95.0 males. For every 100 females age 18 and over, there were 94.6 males.

The median income for a household in the CDP was $42,176, and the median income for a family was $52,643. Males had a median income of $39,438 versus $27,875 for females. The per capita income for the CDP was $20,303. About 2.3% of families and 1.9% of the population were below the poverty line, including none of those under age 18 and 1.6% of those age 65 or over.

See also
Seekonk, Massachusetts

References

Census-designated places in Bristol County, Massachusetts
Seekonk, Massachusetts
Providence metropolitan area
Census-designated places in Massachusetts